Meir'enaim Synagogue is a synagogue in Cairo, Egypt.

Synagogues in Cairo